The United States Maritime Administration (MARAD) is an agency of the United States Department of Transportation. MARAD administers financial programs to develop, promote, and operate the U.S. Maritime Service and the U.S. Merchant Marine. In addition it conducts research and development activities in the maritime field; regulates the transfer of U.S. documented vessels to foreign registries; maintains equipment, shipyard facilities, and reserve fleets of Government-owned ships essential for national defense.

MARAD also maintains the National Defense Reserve Fleet (NDRF) as a ready source of ships for use during national emergencies and logistically supporting the military when needed.

History
When the United States Maritime Commission was abolished on May 24, 1950, its functions were split between the Federal Maritime Board which was responsible for regulating shipping and awarding subsidies for construction and operation of merchant vessels, and Maritime Administration, which was responsible for administering subsidy programs, maintaining the national defense reserve merchant fleet, and operating the United States Merchant Marine Academy.

In 1961, the Federal Maritime Board regulatory functions were assumed by the newly created Federal Maritime Commission, while the subsidy functions were assigned to the Maritime Subsidy Board of the Maritime Administration.

On August 6, 1981, MARAD came under control of the Department of Transportation thereby bringing all transportation programs under one cabinet-level department.

Leadership
Ann C. Phillips, Administrator 
Lucinda Lessley, Deputy Maritime Administrator
Kevin Tokarski, Associate Administrator, Strategic Sealift
Vice Admiral Jack Buono, USMS, Superintendent, United States Merchant Marine Academy
Delia Davis, Associate Administrator, Administration
Corey Beckett, Associate Administrator, Budget and Programs/Chief Financial Officer 
Michael Carter, Associate Administrator, Environment and Compliance
William Paape, Associate Administrator, Ports & Waterways
David Heller, Associate Administrator, Business and Finance Development

Maritime Academies
The Maritime Administration collaborates extensively with stakeholders from all transportation sectors and modes in order to accomplish its mission to improve and strengthen the U.S. marine transportation system. MARAD operates one federal service academy and administers a Grant-In-Aid Program for six state-operated maritime academies:

Students at these academies can graduate with appropriate United States Coast Guard licenses (Mate or Engineer) if they choose to take the Coast Guard License exam, and may become commissioned reserve officers in any branch of the service when graduating from USMMA or a ROTC scholarship from one of the other maritime schools.

Subsidies
The Maritime Subsidy Board negotiates contracts for ship construction and grants operating-differential subsidies to shipping companies.

Maritime Security Program
The Maritime Administrator is vested with the residual powers of the Director of the National Shipping Authority, which was established in 1951 to organize and direct emergency merchant marine operations.

The Maritime Security Program (MSP) authorizes MARAD to enter into contracts with U.S.-flag commercial ship owners to provide service during times of war or national emergencies. As of 2007, ten companies have signed contracts providing the MSP with a reserve of sixty cargo vessels.

Past Administrators

See also

 Merchant navy

References

External links

United States Maritime Administration in the Federal Register
MARAD page in the U.S. Naval Vessel Register
Papers of Louis S. Rothschild (Administrator of the United States Maritime Administration 1953-1955), Dwight D. Eisenhower Presidential Library

Maritime Administration
United States admiralty law
1950 establishments in Washington, D.C.